Eburnation is a degenerative process of bone commonly found in patients with osteoarthritis or non-union of fractures. Friction in the joint causes the reactive conversion of the sub-chondral bone to an ivory-like surface at the site of the cartilage erosion. The word eburnation in fact comes from Latin eburneus, which means "of ivory"

Osteoarthritis is a degenerative disease of the joints characterized largely by central loss of cartilage and compensatory peripheral bone formation (osteophytes). Over time, as the cartilage wears away, bare, subchondral bone is revealed. Eburnation describes the bony sclerosis which occurs at the areas of cartilage loss.

References

External links
 Primary osteoarthritis
 Osteoarthritis

Skeletal disorders